The Rio Damuji-class frigates are the largest warships in the Cuban Navy built from former Spanish-built fishing trawlers. Built between 1975 and 1979, they are variously classed as frigates, corvettes, or offshore patrol vessels. The ships' armament consists of Styx missile launchers, 25 mm guns, and the turret of a ZSU-57-2. Originally, three conversions were planned, the third ship being called Rio los Palacios, though likely only two were completed.

The class is named after the Damují River in Cienfuegos Province.

Ships

External links 
 Global Security Technical information

References 

Frigate classes
Frigates of the Cuban Navy